Ram Rajya can refer to the following films:

 Ram Rajya (1943 film)
 Ram Rajya (1967 film)
 Ramrajya (2022 film)

Disambiguation pages